Paraneaetha is a monotypic genus of Egyptian jumping spiders containing the single species, Paraneaetha diversa. It was first described by J. Denis in 1947, and is only found in Egypt. The name is a combination of the Ancient Greek "para", meaning "alongside", and the salticid genus Neaetha.

References

Arthropods of Egypt
Endemic fauna of Egypt
Monotypic Salticidae genera
Salticidae
Spiders of North Africa